Novosphingobium kunmingense  is a Gram-negative, strictly aerobic and rod-shaped bacterium from the genus Novosphingobium which has been isolated from a phosphate mine in Kunming in China.

References

External links
Type strain of Novosphingobium kunmingense at BacDive -  the Bacterial Diversity Metadatabase	

Bacteria described in 2014
Sphingomonadales